Nancy A. Collins (born September 10, 1959) is an American horror fiction writer best known for her series of vampire novels featuring her character Sonja Blue. 
Collins has also written for comic books, including the Swamp Thing (vol. 2) series, Jason vs. Leatherface, Predator: Hell Come A' Walkin''' and her own one-shot issue Dhampire: Stillborn.

Collins was born in McGehee, Arkansas, United States. She lived in New Orleans, Louisiana in the 1980s; after time in  New York City and Atlanta, Georgia she moved about the South for several years, living in coastal North Carolina and Virginia, before settling in Macon, Georgia in 2019.

Writing
Collins has written numerous novels since 1989, most of which refer to and directly include races of creatures the author calls Pretenders, monsters from myth and legend passing as human to better hunt their prey. She is best known for Sonja Blue, a young woman with demonic powers who after being taught by an older male mentor, hunts and kills vampires.  Her first appearance was in 1989. A. Asbjørn Jøn notes possible intertextual links between the Whistler character in the 1998 movie Blade and a character named Whistler in the Sonja Blue novel, A Dozen Black Roses (1996), as they possess "striking similarities in role, dramatic focus, visual appearance, and sharing the name". Margaret L. Carter, in her article on 20th century vampire fiction, listed Sunglasses After Dark as one of the 13 most influential vampire novels published after 1970, particularly in the way Collins depicted vampires as parasitic beings with no identity of their own who 'borrow' the memories of their hosts.

Bibliography

Chapbooks
 The Tortuga Hill Gang's Last Ride: The True Story (1991)
 Cold Turkey (1992)
 Voodoo Chile (2002)
 The Thing From Lover's Lane (2003)

Non-fiction
 The Big Book of Losers (1996)
 Drawn Swords' - "Foreword" (2017)
 From Bayou To Abyss: Examining John Constantine, Hellblazer - "What Do You Do With An Undead Sailor?" (2020)
 REH Changed My Life - "REH: Opener of the Way" (2021)

Comic books
 Swamp Thing (vol. 2) (DC/Vertigo, 1991–1993)
 Jason vs. Leatherface (Topps Comics, 1995)
 Sunglasses After Dark (Verotik Publications, 1995–1997)
 Machina Jones (Marvel Comics, 1995)
 Dhampire: Stillborn (Vertigo, 1996; DC Comics, 1997) 
 Predator: Hell Come A' Walkin' (Dark Horse, 1996)
 Vampirella (Dynamite, 2014–2016)
 Sunglasses After Dark: Full Blooded Edition (IDW, 2015)
 Army of Darkness: Furious Road (Dynamite Entertainment, 2016)
 Swamp Thing by Nancy A. Collins Omnibus (DC Comics/DC Black Label, 2020)

Awards
 Bram Stoker Award First Novel winner (1990): Sunglasses After Dark Bram Stoker Best Novellette nominee (1997): The Thing From Lover's Lane Bram Stoker Best Collection nominee (2003): Knuckles and Tales International Horror Guild Best Collection nominee (2003): Knuckles and Tales

Other
She is the founder of the International Horror Guild.

See also

List of horror fiction authors

References

Further reading

 David Mathew, "Collins, Nancy A(verill)", in David Pringle, ed., St. James Guide to Horror, Ghost and Gothic Writers'' (Detroit: St. James Press, 1998)

External links

 Collins' "True Blue - The Official Sonja Blue Blog"
Myspace Golgotham
 Nancy A. Collins on GoodReads

American horror novelists
Erotic horror writers
American comics writers
Female comics writers
20th-century American novelists
Writers from Arkansas
Novelists from Louisiana
Novelists from Georgia (U.S. state)
1959 births
Living people
American erotica writers
21st-century American novelists
American women short story writers
People from McGehee, Arkansas
Women horror writers
American women novelists
20th-century American women writers
21st-century American women writers
Women erotica writers
20th-century American short story writers
21st-century American short story writers
Weird fiction writers